The USAF Weapons School is a unit of the United States Air Force and United States Space Force, assigned to the 57th Wing and Space Delta 1.  It is located at Nellis AFB, Nevada.

Mission
The mission of the USAF Weapons School is to teach graduate-level instructor courses, which provide advanced training in weapons and tactics employment to officers of the combat air forces. The USAF Weapons School is headquartered at Nellis Air Force Base in Nevada with detachments at Dyess Air Force Base, Texas, Hurlburt Field, Florida, Little Rock Air Force Base, Arkansas, Whiteman Air Force Base, Missouri, Holloman Air Force Base, New Mexico, Fairchild Air Force Base, Washington, McChord Field, Washington, and Barksdale Air Force Base, Louisiana.

The Weapons School accomplishes its mission by providing graduate-level, instructor academic and flying courses to USAF Combat Air Forces (CAF) and Mobility Air Forces (MAF). It conducts extensive technical off-station training and is a liaison with CAF and MAF units. It publishes the quarterly USAF Weapons Review with worldwide readership. All positions are selectively manned.

The Weapons School's squadrons include the Weapons Instructor Courses for the following aircraft and systems: Air Battle Manager, A-10 Thunderbolt II, Lockheed AC-130, B-1 Lancer, B-2 Spirit, B-52 Stratofortress, C-17 Globemaster III, C-130 Hercules, Control Reporting Center EC-130H Compass Call, F-15C Eagle, F-15E Strike Eagle, F-16 Fighting Falcon, F-22A Raptor, Joint Terminal Attack Controller, Weapons Director, MQ-9 Reaper, HC-130J Combat King II, HH-60 Pave Hawk, KC-135 Stratotanker, MC-130, RC-135 Rivet Joint, U-2 Dragon Lady, Intelligence, Space, ICBM, Cyber, and Support.

History

Origins 

The USAF Weapons School traces its roots to the Aircraft Gunnery School established in 1949 at Las Vegas Air Force Base (which became Nellis Air Force Base in 1950). This organization brought together a cadre of World War II combat veterans dedicated to teaching the next generation of pilots. The Gunnery School converted to combat crew training to meet the needs of the Korean War. In January 1954, the school assumed the mission of training fighter instructors, and took on the title, "USAF Fighter Weapons School." Students at Nellis trained in F-51 Mustang. F-80 Shooting Star. F-84 Thunderjet and all versions of the F-100 Super Sabre aircraft during this period. By 1960. the F-100 and the F-105 Thunderchief were left as the two primary aircraft flown at the Weapons School.

Vietnam era 
In 1965, the Fighter Weapons School added the F-4 Phantom II to its courses. As the roles of fighter aircraft expanded during the Vietnam War, the Fighter Weapons School began to have an impact across the larger Air Force. Many of the air-to-ground and air-to-air innovations of this period can be traced to the Weapons School. Assigned aircraft continued to change in concert with Air Force inventories. The Weapons School deactivated the F-100 and F-105 courses, and added the F-111 and A-7D Corsair II.

Post–Vietnam War era 

The Aggressors, flying the T-38 Talon and F-5E Tiger II were stood-up as part of the Weapons School in the early 1970s to improve air-to-air skills by providing accurate threat replication for dissimilar air combat training. The A-7D tenure in the school was a brief 3 years as the squadron transitioned from A-7s to F-5 Aggressors in 1975. Fighter modernization brought both the A-10 Thunderbolt II and the F-15 Eagle into Weapons School operations in 1977.

The 1980s ushered in a time of significant change for the Weapons School. In 1981, the school underwent a complete reorganization as the squadrons became divisions. The Aggressor squadrons transferred to the 57th Fighter Weapons Wing. The F-111 Division became a geographically separated detachment of the Nellis-based Weapons School. The newly formed F-16 Fighting Falcon Division graduated its first students in 1982. In 1984 the Weapons School expanded its courses beyond the traditional fighter aircrew, adding a course to train weapons controllers in the F-15 Division. A passing of the torch to the current Weapons School occurred when the last F-4 class graduated in 1985, ending 20 years of F-4 weapons officer training. The Air Weapons Controller Division, later known as the Command and Control Operations (CCO) Division activated as a separate unit in 1987. The school gained a Fighter Intelligence Officers Course in 1988 which became the graduate patch-awarding Intelligence Division in 1990. The F-15E Strike Eagle Division became part of the school in 1991.

Modern era 
With the stand-up of Air Combat Command in 1992, the school embarked on a dramatic shift from its 43-year focus exclusively on fighter aviation, dropping the "fighter" from its title and becoming the "Air Force Weapons School." The change was much more than symbolic with the activation of the B-52 and B-1 Divisions that year. Rescue helicopters joined the school with the HH-60 Division in 1995 while the F-111 retired. That year also saw the addition of RC-135 RIVET JOINT and EC-130 COMPASS CALL courses to the CCO Division. To increase the graduate-level understanding of space and air integration for operators, the school added the Space Division in 1996.

With a growing need for weapons officers skilled at integrating all aspects of air and space power, the Weapons School has continued to expand. 2000 saw the addition of the E-8 JSTARS to the CCO Division. Special Operations Forces (SOF) also became part of the Weapons School in 2000,developing courses for the MH-53 and AC-130 and Stealth joined the school in 2002 with the addition of the F-117 and B-2 Divisions. SOF added an MC-130 course that year as well. In 2003, all of the Weapons School divisions were re-designated (or initially activated) as squadrons, and the Intelligence Sensor Weapons Instructor Course was added to provide graduate-level training in intelligence, surveillance, and reconnaissance integration. In 2006, the F-117 Weapons Instructor Course deactivated and the merger with the Mobility Weapons School added the C-130, KC-135, and C-17 Weapons Instructor Courses.  In 2008, the F-22 joined the Weapons School and in 2009, the ICBM Weapons Instructor Course was added. In 2012, the Cyber Warfare Operations Weapons Instructor Course was founded and joined the space squadron. In 2019, the Weapons School added the U-2 Weapons Instructor Course. In 2020, the Weapons School added the Control Reporting Center Instructor Course under the 8th WPS which had previously been an Advanced Instructor Course for enlisted ground based controllers.

Today's Weapons School encompasses 21 squadrons, teaching 24 combat specialties at 9 locations. Only 30% of today's students come from the classic fighter specialties.

Lineage
 Constituted as USAF Fighter Weapons School, and activated, on 30 December 1965
 Organized on 1 January 1966
 Discontinued, and inactivated, on 1 September 1966
 Activated on 30 December 1981
 Re-designated USAF Weapons School on 15 June 1993

Assignments
 Tactical Air Command, 30 December 1965
 4520 Combat Crew Training Wing, 1 Jan-1 Sep 1966
 57th Fighter Weapons (later, 57th Fighter; 57th) Wing, 30 Dec 1981–present

Components
On 3 February 2003, the divisions of the USAF Weapons School formally became squadrons. Each of the new squadrons received the designation of a previously highly decorated notable inactivated unit.

Nellis-based units

Geographically separated units

Inactive units
 A-7D Division (1972–1981)
 F-4 Division (1972–1985)
 F-111 Division (1972–1992)
 417th Weapons Squadron, F-117 Nighthawk, Holloman AFB, New Mexico
 715th Weapons Squadron, B-2, Whiteman AFB, Missouri

Stations
 Nellis AFB, NV, 1 Jan – 1 Sep 1966; 30 Dec 1981 – present

See also
 NAWDC (USN/USMC equivalent, delivering Naval Air Weapons Courses, including TOPGUN)
 ASWC (UK Royal Air Force equivalent, delivering the Qualified Weapons Instructor (QWI) courses.)

References

 Nellis 57th Wing Fact Sheet
 AFHRA USAF Weapons School

External links
 United States Air Force Weapons School
 Air & Space Smithsonian article about USAF Fighter Weapons School in 1957  (or archived copy)

Las Vegas Valley
Military in Nevada
Staff colleges of the United States